Laheküla was a village (until 2017) in Orissaare Parish, Saare County in western Estonia.

References 

Villages in Saare County